John Clifford Shaw (February 23, 1922 – February 9, 1991) was a systems programmer at the RAND Corporation. He is a coauthor of the first artificial intelligence program, the Logic Theorist, and was one of the developers of General Problem Solver (universal problem solver machine) and Information Processing Language (a programming language of the 1950s). It is considered the true "father" of the JOSS language. One of the most significant events that occurred in the programming was the development of the concept of list processing by Allen Newell, Herbert A. Simon and Cliff Shaw during the development of the language IPL-V. He invented the linked list, which remains fundamental in many strands of modern computing technology.

References

External links
Simon, Herbert A. Allen Newell - a referenced biography of Newell and Shaw at the National Academy of Sciences.

People in information technology
Artificial intelligence researchers
Carnegie Mellon University faculty
Place of birth missing
1922 births
1991 deaths